Robert Augustus de Lasaux (24 November 1834 – 7 December 1914) was an English amateur cricketer. He was born at Canterbury in Kent in 1834, the son of the city coroner and was educated in Canterbury and in Kennington.

De Lasaux made his first-class debut for the Gentlemen of Kent against the Gentlemen of England at Lord's in 1858. He made two further known first-class appearances in 1858, one for Kent County Cricket Club against England and another for the Gentlemen of Kent against the Gentlemen of England at the St Lawrence Ground. He was one of the original members of the amateur Band of Brothers cricket team and of St Lawrence Cricket Club in Canterbury and was described in his Wisden obituary as "a good fast-medium round-armed bowler" and a "very smart" fielder.

De Lasaux died at Canterbury in 1914 aged 80. His obituary in The Times records that he was "an expert diabolo player" as a youth and had revived his skills for an exhibition in 1907.

References

External links

1834 births
1914 deaths
Sportspeople from Canterbury
English cricketers
Kent cricketers
Gentlemen of Kent cricketers